Billy Shergold (William Richard Shergold) was a Welsh professional footballer, born in Slade Street, Newport, where his Grandfather moved for work from Wiltshire in 1886, a mere quarter-of-a-mile from Somerton Park, home of his future team Newport County. An inside-forward, he joined Newport County in 1947 from Bishop Auckland. He went on to make 273 Football League appearances for Newport County scoring 48 goals, at the time Newport County were playing in Division 4 (North) and 3rd Division (South). He is the 7th longest serving member of Newport County. In 1956 he joined Weymouth with 104 appearances and 37 goals in two years.

On 29 Mar 1947 Billy Shergold played for Wales against England in a friendly in Newport. England won the match 2–1.

On Monday 8 May 1967 a testimonial match took place at Newport County, for the Billy Shergold Testimonial Fund.

References

External links

1923 births
1968 deaths
Welsh footballers
Newport County A.F.C. players
Weymouth F.C. players
English Football League players
Footballers from Newport, Wales
Date of death missing
Bishop Auckland F.C. players
Association football inside forwards